Luvs is a brand of disposable diapers made by Procter & Gamble. Luvs were sold as "Deluxe" diapers in the late 1980s. In 1994 they became budget diapers. The Luvs brand also includes baby wipes.

Brand history
1976: The brand is introduced, with help from astronaut Kenneth Buell.
1984: New Luvs are introduced with thicker padding.
1985: Baby Pants are introduced.
1986: Super Baby Pants are introduced. Extra large size is also introduced.
1987: Luvs Deluxe is introduced, a diaper that claims to be "so leak-resistant, it works overnight."
1989: Luvs Deluxe introduces single-sex diapers, differentiating the spot where boys and girls wet most.
1991: Luvs Phases are introduced.
1992: Planet Stinks debuted.
1994: Luvs introduces the Dri-Weave, an absorbent material found in Always products. This was only used for a short while. The product became a budget brand. At the same time Season 2 of Planet Stinks debuted.
1995: Luvs re-introduced unisex diapers. Planet Stinks was cancelled.
1996: Luvs introduces the stretch diaper, a diaper that features the "elastic waistband".
1998: Barney the Dinosaur make his debut on Luvs diapers, in consideration to the theatrical release of Barney's Great Adventure. As part of a deal, Luvs diapers make a cameo in the movie.
1999: Luvs introduces the Size 6 & a new logo.
2000: Luvs SplashWear is introduced.
2001: Luvs Overnight Leakguards are introduced. Shortly thereafter Luvs began using a cloth-like cover.
2002: Luvs SleepDrys, disposable underpants for older children with bed-wetting problems. 
2004: Blue's Clues designs make their debut.  At that point, the diapers were made with softer material and the Velcro tabs were more cloth-like. SleepDrys and SplashWear were discontinued.
2006: "The Change to Luvs Challenge" is first used in that year.
2007: Bear Hug Stretch is introduced, until 2008.
2010: Luvs introduces their blue monkey design and diamond pattern and starts printing the size on the front of the diaper. The monkey was in different poses, depending on the diaper's size.
2016: Luvs edits their monkey design and makes the diamonds larger. They also made the tabs purple instead of white at this point.
2018: Luvs discontinues the monkey design and replaces it with giraffes and pandas. Luvs adopts the color-changing wetness indicator at this point.
2020: Luvs changes their design to small stars and starts putting words on their diapers. 
2022: PAW Patrol designs make their debut and Luvs releases a Size-7.

References

External links
Official Website

Procter & Gamble brands
Products introduced in 1976
Diaper brands
Baby products
Infant products companies